The McCall House, also known as the Arsenal House, is a historic home located at Fayetteville, Cumberland County, North Carolina. It was built about 1862, and is a small one-story, four bay, frame building with board-and-batten siding. It rests on a brick pier foundation and has a gable roof. The front facade features a full-width, hip roof porch.

It was listed on the National Register of Historic Places in 1983.

References

Houses on the National Register of Historic Places in North Carolina
Houses completed in 1862
Houses in Fayetteville, North Carolina
National Register of Historic Places in Cumberland County, North Carolina
1862 establishments in North Carolina